The List of shipwrecks in 1781 includes some ships sunk, wrecked or otherwise lost during 1781.

January

8 January

11 January

22 January

23 January

28 January

30 January

Unknown date

February

2 February

7 February

11 February

12 February

13 February

16 February

22 February

26 February

Unknown date

March

30 March

Unknown date

April

10 April

11 April

13 April

14 April

21 April

28 April

Unknown date

May

2 May

7 May

17 May

28 May

Unknown date

June

7 June

10 June

Unknown date

July

3 July

21 July

23 July

Unknown date

August

1 August

2 August

5 August

15 August

17 August

21 August

24 August

Unknown date

September

4 September

5 September

9 September

17 September

27 September

28 September

29 September

Unknown date

October

10 October

11 October

15 October

17 October

18 October

24 October

29 October

Unknown date

November

5 November

6 November

14 November

21 November

28 November

Unknown date

December

1 December

3 December

7 December

17 December

18 December

21 December

22 December

25 December

28 December

30 December

Unknown date

Unknown date

References

1781